In statistics, ordered probit is a generalization of the widely used probit analysis to the case of more than two outcomes of an ordinal dependent variable (a dependent variable for which the potential values have a natural ordering, as in poor, fair, good, excellent). Similarly, the widely used logit method also has a counterpart ordered logit. Ordered probit, like ordered logit, is a particular method of ordinal regression.

For example, in clinical research, the effect a drug may have on a patient may be modeled with ordered probit regression.  Independent variables may include the use or non-use of the drug as well as control variables such as age and details from medical history such as whether the patient suffers from high blood pressure, heart disease, etc. The dependent variable would be ranked from the following list: complete cure, relieve symptoms, no effect, deteriorate condition, death.

Another example application are Likert-type items commonly employed in survey research, where respondents rate their agreement on an ordered scale (e.g., "Strongly disagree" to "Strongly agree").  The ordered probit model provides an appropriate fit to these data, preserving the ordering of response options while making no assumptions of the interval distances between options.

Conceptual underpinnings

Suppose the underlying relationship to be characterized is

,

Further suppose that while we cannot observe , we instead can only observe the categories of response:

Estimation

The model cannot be consistently estimated using ordinary least squares; it is usually estimated using maximum likelihood. For details on how the equation is  estimated, see the article Ordinal regression.

References

Further reading
 

Categorical regression models